Derzelas (Darzalas) was a Dacian or Thracian chthonic god of abundance and the underworld, health and human spirit's vitality.

Darzalas was the god of Hellenistic period Odessos (modern Varna) and was frequently depicted on its coinage from the third century BCE to the third century CE and portrayed in numerous terracotta figurines, as well as in a rare 4th century BC lead one (photo), found in the city. Darzalas was often depicted in himation, holding cornucopiae with altars by his side. There was a temple dedicated to him with a cult statue, and games (Darzaleia) were held in his honor every five years, possibly attended by Gordian III in 238 CE.
   
Another temple dedicated to Derzelas was built at Histria - a Greek colony on the shore of the Black Sea in the third century BC.

Darzalas Peak on Trinity Peninsula in Antarctica is named after the god.

Notes 

History of Varna, Bulgaria
Culture in Varna, Bulgaria
Thracian gods
Dacian gods
Health gods